Kafr Kila may refer to:

Kafr Kila, Syria, a village in northern Syria
Kafr Kila, Lebanon, a village in Lebanon